Late-onset hypogonadism (LOH) or testosterone deficiency syndrome (TDS) is a condition in older men characterized by measurably low testosterone levels and clinical symptoms mostly of a sexual nature, including decreased desire for sex, fewer spontaneous erections, and erectile dysfunction. It is the result of a gradual drop in testosterone; a steady decline in testosterone levels of about 1% per year can happen and is well documented in both men and women.

Signs and symptoms
Some men present with the symptoms, but with normal testosterone levels, and some men with low testosterone levels have no symptoms; the reasons for this are not known.

Some men in their late 40s and early 50s develop depression, loss of libido, erectile dysfunction, and other physical and emotional symptoms such as irritability, loss of muscle mass and reduced ability to exercise, weight gain, lack of energy, difficulty sleeping, or poor concentration; many of these symptoms may arise from a midlife crisis or as the results of a long-term unhealthy lifestyle (smoking, excess drinking, overeating, lack of exercise) and may be best addressed by lifestyle changes, therapy, or antidepressants.

Causes
Testosterone levels are well-documented to decline with aging at about 1% per year in both men and women after a certain age; the causes are not well understood.

Diagnosis

As of 2016, the International Society for the Study of the Aging Male defines late-onset hypogonadism as a series of symptoms in older adults related to testosterone deficiency that combines features of both primary and secondary hypogonadism; the European Male Aging Study (a prospective study of ~3000 men) defined the condition by the presence of at least three sexual symptoms (e.g. reduced libido, reduced spontaneous erections, and erectile dysfunction) and total testosterone concentrations less than 11 nmol/L (3.2 ng/mL) and free testosterone concentrations less than 220 pmol/L (64 pg/mL).

If a person has symptoms of late-onset hypogonadism, testosterone is measured by taking blood in the morning on at least two days; while immunoassays are commonly used, mass spectrometry is more accurate and is becoming more widely available. The meaning of the measurement is different depending on many factors that affect how testosterone is made and how it is carried in the blood. Increased concentrations of proteins that bind testosterone in blood occur if the person is older, has hyperthyroidism or liver disease, or is taking anticonvulsant drugs (which are increasingly used for depression and various neuropathies), and decreased concentrations of proteins that bind testosterone occur if the person is obese, has diabetes, has hypothyroidism, has liver disease, or is taking glucocorticoids or androgens, or progestins. If levels are low, conditions that cause primary and secondary hypogonadism need to be ruled out.

Screening
Due to difficulty and expense of testing, and the ambiguity of the results, screening is not recommended. While some clinical instruments (standard surveys) had been developed as of 2016, their specificity was too low to be useful clinically.

Management

The significance of a decrease in testosterone levels is debated and its treatment with replacement is controversial. The Food and Drug Administration (FDA) stated in 2015 that neither the benefits nor the safety of testosterone have been established in older men with low testosterone levels.
Testosterone replacement therapy should only be started if low levels have been confirmed; in the US, this confirmation is not done about 25% of the time, as of 2015. Testosterone levels should also be monitored during therapy.

Adverse effects

Adverse effects of testosterone supplementation may include increased cardiovascular (CV) events (including strokes and heart attacks) and deaths, especially in men over 65 and men with pre-existing heart conditions. The potential for CV risks from testosterone therapy led the FDA to issue a requirement in 2015 that testosterone pharmaceutical labels include warning information about the possibility of an increased risk of heart attacks and stroke. However, the data are mixed, so the European Medicines Agency, the American Association of Clinical Endocrinologists, and the American College of Endocrinology have stated that no consistent evidence shows that testosterone therapy either increases or decreases cardiovascular risk.

Other significant adverse effects of testosterone supplementation include acceleration of pre-existing prostate cancer growth; increased hematocrit, which can require venipuncture to treat; and, exacerbation of sleep apnea.

Adverse effects may also include minor side effects such as acne and oily skin, as well as significant hair loss and/or thinning of the hair, which may be prevented with 5-alpha reductase inhibitors ordinarily used for the treatment of benign prostatic hyperplasia, such as finasteride or dutasteride.

Exogenous testosterone may also cause suppression of spermatogenesis, leading to, in some cases, infertility.

Prognosis 
As of 2015, the evidence is inconclusive as to whether testosterone replacement therapy can help with erectile dysfunction in men with late-onset hypogonadism. It appears that testosterone replacement therapy may benefit men with symptoms of frailty who have late-onset hypogonadism.

Epidemiology
The epidemiology is not clear; 20% of men in their 60s and 30% of men in their 70s have low testosterone; around 5% of men between 70 and 79 have both low testosterone and the symptoms, so are diagnosed with late-onset hypogonadism. The UK National Health Service describes it as rare.

History
The impact of low levels of testosterone has been previously reported. In 1944, Heller and Myers identified symptoms of what they labeled the "male climacteric" including loss of libido and potency, nervousness, depression, impaired memory, the inability to concentrate, fatigue, insomnia, hot flushes, and sweating. Heller and Myers found that their subjects had lower than normal levels of testosterone, and that symptoms decreased dramatically when patients were given replacement doses of testosterone.

Society and culture
The 1997 book Male Menopause by Jed Diamond, a psychologist with a PhD in international health,
fueled popular interest in the concept of "andropause".
Diamond regards andropause as a change of life in middle-aged men which has hormonal, physical, psychological, interpersonal, social, sexual, and spiritual aspects. Diamond claims that this change occurs in all men, that it may occur as early as age 45 to 50 and more dramatically after the age of 70 in some men, and that women's and men's experiences are somewhat similar phenomena. The medical community has rejected the term "andropause" and its supposed parallels with menopause.

Thomas Perls and David J. Handelsman, in a 2015 editorial in the Journal of the American Geriatrics Society, say that between the ill-defined nature of the diagnosis and the pressure and advertising from drug companies selling testosterone and human-growth hormone, as well as dietary supplement companies selling all kinds of "boosters" for aging men, the condition is overdiagnosed and overtreated.
Perls and Handelsman note that in the US, "sales of testosterone increased from $324 million in 2002 to $2 billion in 2012, and the number of testosterone doses prescribed climbed from 100 million in 2007 to half a billion in 2012, not including the additional contributions from compounding pharmacies, Internet, and direct-to-patient clinic sales."

Terminology
Late-onset hypogonadism is an endocrine condition as well as a result of aging.

The terms "male menopause" and "andropause" are used in the popular media but are misleading, as they imply a sudden change in hormone levels similar to what women experience in menopause. A decrease in libido in men as a result of age is sometimes colloquially referred to as penopause.

Research directions
As of 2016, research was necessary to find better ways to measure testosterone and to be better able to understand the measurements in any given person, and to understand why some people with low testosterone do not present with symptoms and some with seemingly adequate levels do present with symptoms. Research was also necessary to better understand the cardiovascular risks of testosterone replacement therapy in older men.

A relationship between late-onset hypogonadism and risk of Alzheimer's disease has been hypothesized, and some small clinical studies have been conducted to investigate the prevention of Alzheimer's disease in men with late-onset hypogonadism; as of 2009, results were inconclusive.

See also
 European Menopause and Andropause Society

References

External links 
 

Endocrinology
Menopause
Middle age
Testosterone
Andrology